Tosapusia cupressina is an extinct species of sea snail, a marine gastropod mollusk, in the family Costellariidae, the ribbed miters.

Distribution
Fossils of this extinct marine species were found in Pliocene strata in Alpes-Maritimes,France

References

 Chirli (C.) & Richard (C.), 2008 - Les Mollusques plaisanciens de la Côte d’Azur, p. 1-128, 5 figures
 Harzhauser (M.) & Landau (B.), 2021 - An overlooked diversity—the Costellariidae (Gastropoda: Neogastropoda) of the Miocene Paratethys Sea. Zootaxa, t. 4982, vol. 1, p. 1-70, fig. 1-21

cupressina
Gastropods described in 1814